The Liberal Party (Hizb al-Ahrar) in Mandatory Palestine was established in 1930 by Hassan Sidqi al-Dajani and others.

Liberal parties in Asia
Defunct liberal political parties
History of Mandatory Palestine
Political parties in Mandatory Palestine
Political parties established in 1930
1930 establishments in Mandatory Palestine
Political parties with year of disestablishment missing